Franks-A-Lot, or Franks A Lot, is a hot dog restaurant in Portland, Oregon. Previously, the business operated as The Dog House.

Description 

Franks-A-Lot is a restaurant in the Whole Foods parking lot on East Burnside Street in the Kerns neighborhood. Housed in a small A-frame cottage, the restaurant has "always focused on quick, take-away, drive-thru dogs", according to Thrillist. The menu has included the Great American Frank, the Long Wiener Frank (a longer version of a standard hot dog), and Chicago-style hot dogs with or without toppings, as well as German sausages, polish hot dogs, and vegetable franks. The Jumbo American has sweet-hot mustard, jalapeños, and sauerkraut. There are vegan options as well. In 2014, Samantha Bakall of The Oregonian said the restaurant "has the vibe of a Chicago joint" and described the Chicago-style hot dog as an "all-beef frank topped with yellow mustard, relish, cucumbers, red onions, sport peppers, fresh tomato slices and celery salt".

In 2022, Nathan Williams of Eater Portland described the cottage as "faux-Bavarian" and said the business serves "jumbo-sized" hot dogs and hand-made milkshakes. There are seven outdoor tables for seating, only one of which is covered, as of 2022.

History 

The restaurant was previously known as The Dog House.

Reception 
Douglas Perry included Franks-A-Lot in The Oregonian 2008 overview of Portland's best hot dogs. Drew Tyson included the business in Thrillist's 2015 list of "The 12 Best Hot Dog Spots in Portland" and recommended the Long Wiener Frank. Franks-A-Lot had a rating of four stars based on 124 Yelp reviews, as of 2019. Eater Portland Nathan Williams included the restaurant in a 2022 list of "17 Places Serving Portland's Finest Hot Dogs".

See also

 List of hot dog restaurants

References

External links 

 Franks A Lot at Zomato

Hot dog restaurants in Oregon
Kerns, Portland, Oregon
Northeast Portland, Oregon
Restaurants in Portland, Oregon